The Health Protection (Coronavirus) Regulations 2020 (SI 2020/129) was a set of regulations that came into effect in England on 10 February 2020 as a statutory instrument made under the Public Health (Control of Disease) Act 1984. The regulations were revoked on 25 March 2020.



Legal basis 
The regulations were enacted by the Secretary of State for Health and Social Care, Matt Hancock, on the basis that the incidence and transmission of COVID-19 caused by the SARS-CoV-2 virus represented a sufficient public health threat to introduce powers to keep individuals in isolation where public health professionals believed there was reasonable risk.

Provisions
The regulations applied to England only. On 14 February 2020 the Secretary of State designated Arrowe Park Hospital in Merseyside and the Kents Hill Park centre in Milton Keynes as "isolation" facilities, and the Hubei province of China (including Wuhan City) as an "infected area".

Revocation 
The regulations were revoked on 25 March 2020, on the same day that the Coronavirus Act 2020 came it force. More stringent regulations were introduced the next day, as The Health Protection (Coronavirus, Restrictions) (England) Regulations 2020.

See also

 The Health Protection (Coronavirus, Restrictions) (England) Regulations 2020
 List of Statutory Instruments of the United Kingdom, 2020

References 

Public health in the United Kingdom
COVID-19 pandemic in England
Statutory Instruments of the United Kingdom
2020 in British law
Law associated with the COVID-19 pandemic in the United Kingdom